The Fourth Plague: Flies is an EP by American metal band A Life Once Lost, released in 2001.

Track listing 
"Chileab" – 1:59
"Our Second Home" – 2:19
"The Dead Sea" – 2:37
"Prepare Yourself for What Is About to Come" – 2:48
"The Tide" – 2:48

Personnel 
A Life Once Lost
Robert Carpenter – guitars
T.J. De Blois – drums
Robert Meadows – vocals
Douglas Sabolick – guitars, backing vocals
Richard Arnold – bass

Production
Vincent Ratti – engineering, mastering, mixing

Artwork
Aaron Turner – artwork, package construction

References 

2001 EPs
A Life Once Lost albums
Deathwish Inc. EPs
Robotic Empire albums
Albums with cover art by Aaron Turner
Albums with cover art by Jacob Bannon